Bousbach is a commune in the Moselle department in Grand Est in northeastern France.

Etymology
Bousbach has historically been attested as Buezbach in 1429 and Buschbach in 1525. Bousbach and its German counterpart are Germanic in origin, deriving from a High German dialect, ultimately from Proto-West-Germanic *busk. The Germanic hydronym *-bak(i) entered the French language via High German, and took on two forms: the Germanic form -bach and Romantic -bais.

Population

See also
 Communes of the Moselle department

References

External links
 

Communes of Moselle (department)